Alicia Pizzimbono de Nicola (born 1930, Buenos Aires) was the First Lady of Ecuador.

Biography
Alicia Pizzimbono de Nicola was born in 1930 in the Argentine capital Buenos Aires. Two days later, Poveda graduated as a lieutenant and took Pizzimbono with him back to Ecuador, where their two daughters were born.

First Lady of Ecuador
On 11 January 1976, the Ecuadorian Armed Forces forced the resignation of military dictator Guillermo Rodríguez. Poveda, along with Army and Air Force heads  and  formed the Supreme Council of Government, which would govern the country until 1979.

On 8 October 1976, Pizzimbono traveled to Kiel, Germany for the ceremonial launch of Ecuador's first submarine the BAE Shyri, named after the First Lady's godmother.

Citations

Living people
1930 births
First ladies of Ecuador
People from Buenos Aires
Argentine emigrants to Ecuador
21st-century Ecuadorian women politicians
21st-century Ecuadorian politicians